The men's 110 metres hurdles event at the 1959 Pan American Games was held at the Soldier Field in Chicago on 30 and 31 August.

Medalists

Results

Heats
Wind:Heat 1: 0.0 m/s, Heat 2: 0.0 m/s

Final
Wind: +2.5 m/s

References

Athletics at the 1959 Pan American Games
1959